Daniel Miljanović (born 11 April 2001) is a Swedish footballer who plays as a midfielder for Croatian club NK Novigrad.

Club career
Born in Spain, Miljanović started his career at CD El Altet. Miljanović then moved to Elche CF before moving with his family to Sweden and joining Syrianska FC. Between 2016 and 2017, Miljanović also played for IF Elfsborg.

Ahead of the 2018 season, Miljanović joined AFC Eskilstuna. During the 2018 season he played 25 games and scored one goal for fellow club Eskilstuna City in Division 2. Miljanović got injured ahead of the 2019 season and after returning from injury, he played a few games for IFK Eskilstuna in Division 3, while also playing for AFC Eskilstuna's U-21 team. On 18 May 2019, Miljanović made his Allsvenskan debut in a 1-1 match against Helsingborgs IF, where he was substituted in the 68th minute for Ferid Ali.

In June 2020, Miljanović returned to IF Elfsborg to play for the U19 team. In February 2021, Miljanović moved abroad to play for Bosnian side Mladost Doboj Kakanj, where his father was the coach. He later had a short spell at Ljubić Prnjavor, before moving to Croatian club NK Novigrad in 2022.

Personal life
Miljanović was born in Spain, where his father Nemanja was a manager. He moved to Sweden with his family at a young age.

References

External links
Svenskfotboll NT Profile

2001 births
Living people
Footballers from Elche
Association football midfielders
Swedish footballers
Sweden youth international footballers
Swedish men's futsal players
Spanish footballers
Swedish people of Bosnia and Herzegovina descent
Spanish people of Bosnia and Herzegovina descent
Spanish emigrants to Sweden
Elche CF players
Syrianska FC players
IF Elfsborg players
AFC Eskilstuna players
Eskilstuna City FK players
IFK Eskilstuna players
FK Mladost Doboj Kakanj players
FK Ljubić Prnjavor players
NK Novigrad players
Allsvenskan players
Premier League of Bosnia and Herzegovina players